Dermatobranchus dendronephthyphagus is a species of sea slug, a nudibranch, a marine gastropod mollusc in the family Arminidae.

Distribution
This species occurs in the Indo-Pacific region. It was described from Okinawa, Ryukyu Islands, Japan. A specimen from Eastern Australia identified as Dermatobranchus nigropunctatus is probably a misidentification of this species.

References

Arminidae
Gastropods described in 2011